"We Can Make the Morning" is a song written by Jay Ramsey and originally recorded and released by Elvis Presley.

It was released as a single (with "Until It's Time for You to Go" on the opposite side) on January 4, 1972, and included on the album Elvis Now dropped on February 20 of the same year.

Listed on the U.S. Billboard Easy Listening chart as a double A-side with "Until It's Time for You to Go", the song peaked at number 9 for the week of November 3, 1972.

History 
Elvis recorded the song during his March 1971 session at RCA's Studio B. The session featured James Burton and Chip Young on guitar, Norbert Putnam on bass, Jerry Carrigan and Kenneth Buttrey on drums. David Briggs on piano, Glen Spreen on organ, and Charlie McCoy on organ, harmonica and percussion.

Track listing

Charts

References

External links 
 
 We Can Make the Morning / Until It’s Time for You to Go on the official Elvis Presley website

1972 songs
1972 singles
Elvis Presley songs
RCA Records singles
Songs written by Jay Ramsey